This is a list of awards and nominations received by Australian-American singer, songwriter and producer Keith Urban.

Active in the music scene since the 1990s, Urban is regarded as one of the leading country musicians of the 21st century, and has been the recipient of numerous awards. The Academy of Country Music Awards presented Urban with both the Jim Reeves International Award and the Mae Boren Axton Award, in recognition of "outstanding contributions to the acceptance of country music throughout the world.done the most to promote the genre worldwide".  The Country Music Association Awards honored Urban with the Horizon Award, while BMI Awards gave him the Champion Award.

During his career, he has also been nominated nineteen times for Grammy Awards, winning four in the Best Male Country Vocal Performance category. Urban is also the singer, composer and producer of the original song "For You" from film Act of Valor, which earned him nominations at both the 70th Golden Globe Awards and at the 18th Critics' Choice Awards in the respective Best Original Song categories.

Urban is the recipient of four American Music Awards and six ARIA Music Awards, including the Outstanding Achievement Award for his contribution to Australian country music.

Awards and nominations

References

External links 

 

Lists of awards received by Australian musician
Lists of awards received by American musician